Leo Frank "Firpo" Draveling (born June 23, 1907 – July 2, 1955) was an American football player. He played for the Michigan Wolverines football teams from 1928–1930 and for the Cincinnati Reds of the NFL in 1933.

Early years
Draveling was born in Port Huron, Michigan in 1907. In 1925, he played on the Port Huron High School football team that was "undefeated and unscored upon."

University of Michigan
Draveling enrolled at the University of Michigan in 1927 and played football for the Wolverines football teams of 1928, 1929 and 1930.  As a sophomore in 1928, Draveling started seven games as Michigan's right end.  Draveling played a key role in the 1928 Michigan-Ohio State game. He put the Wolverines in the lead 7-6 when he recovered a loose ball in the end zone.  An Ohio State player allowed a punt to roll past him thinking it would reach the end zone for a touchback.  The Ohio State player was blocked into the ball, and Draveling gained possession long enough for the officials to rule that he had scored a touchdown.

In 1929, Draveling started eight games (seven at right end) for the Wolverines. A newspaper feature story on the 1929 Wolverines said the following about Michigan's ends:"One may search a long time before finding a pair of wingmen to match the ability of Captain Joe Truskowski of Detroit and Leo Draveling. They are six feet tall, weigh 200 pounds each, and play a smart game at the flanks.  Each is a master at snagging passes. Truskowski also is a commendable ball-carrier, while Draveling is one of the team's best punters."

As a senior in 1930, Michigan's coach Harry Kipke moved Draveling to the right tackle position.  Draveling was six feet, two inches tall, weighed 208 pounds at the start of the 1930 football season and was "looked upon as a likely all-American."  Due to injuries, Draveling started only four games for the undefeated (8-0-1) 1930 Michigan team that tied for the Big Ten Conference championship.  Despite limited playing time, Draveling was selected as a first-team All-Big Ten player by sports writer Hank Casserly, and as a third-team All-Big Ten player by the United Press.

Draveling also competed for Michigan as a collegiate wrestler in the heavyweight class.  He participated in the second NCAA wrestling championship held at Columbus, Ohio in March 1929. Draveling finished in top four in his weight class, losing a semi-final match to Fairall, Ohio State's best wrestler, in 8 minutes, 45 seconds.

Professional football and later years
After graduating from Michigan, Draveling played one year of professional football for the Cincinnati Reds; he played in nine NFL games for the Reds as a tackle.

Draveling died in July 1955 at age 48. In 2003, he was posthumously inducted into the Port Huron Sports Hall of Fame.

References

1907 births
1955 deaths
People from Port Huron, Michigan
Sportspeople from Metro Detroit
Players of American football from Michigan
Michigan Wolverines football players
Cincinnati Reds (NFL) players